Red Election is an international spy drama television series. The story follows a British intelligence agent (Lydia Leonard) and a Danish secret service agent (Victoria Carmen Sonne) who team up to stop a Russian terrorist attack in Britain. The 10-part series premiered as a Viaplay Original on 3 October 2021.

Cast

Main

Lydia Leonard as Beatrice Ogilvy, MI5 agent
Victoria Carmen Sonne as Katrine Poulson, DSIS agent
Stephen Dillane as William Ogilvy, MI5 director and Beatrice's father
Kobna Holdbrook-Smith as Levi Nichols, MI5 agent
Lorraine Burroughs as Etta Cornwell
Aidan McArdle as Zak
Clinton Liberty as Marcus
Goran Kostić as Oleg Adamov
Ian Kenny as Declan
James D'Arcy as Adam Cornwell, Prime Minister of the United Kingdom

Rori Hawthorn as Holly
Amy Shiels as Nikki Foster-Lyons
Pavel Kříž as Gavel Surkov
Sophie Jo Wasson as Isla Robson
Andy Kellegher as Shaun Graham
Tadhg Murphy as Nigel Braynor
Owen Roe

Recurring
Stephen Hogan as Alaric Henderson, MI5 agent
Niels Justesen as Torben Jensen
Fiach Kunz as Kelvin Cruickshanks

Production

Development
The drama was created by William Diskay, Jonas Fors, with Ola Norén, Roland Ulvselius, and lead writer Stephen Brady. Paul Coates and Rachel Smith joined Stephen Brady on the writing team. Jill Robertson served as lead director and executive producer of the series. Paul Murphy and Declan Recks were also directors on the series. Executive producing were Moreyba Bidessie of A+E Networks. Veronika Eriksson and Christian Alveborg of Mopar Studios would produce. It is part of Mobpar's English-language slate.

Casting
In May 2021, Nordic Entertainment Group announced that Stephen Dillane, Lydia Leonard, James D'Arcy, Kobna Holdbrook-Smith, Lorraine Burroughs, and Victoria Carmen Sonne had been cast in the drama with Sonne and Leonard as the lead spy duo.

Filming
The series and cast announcements dropped just as production wrapped. It had originally begun in 2020, but was shut down after only two weeks due to the COVID-19 pandemic. Filming was able to resume after six months. Principal photography took place in Ireland.

Release
A trailer was released on 23 September 2021. The 10-part series premiered on NENT Group's streaming platform Viaplay in Nordic countries. A+E Networks International are responsible for international distribution. The series premiered on Ovation TV in the United States starting August 6, 2022 as part of the "Mystery Alley" crime drama mystery-themed Saturday night block.

The series premiered on public television channel SBS Television in Australia on 28 October 2021.

The series was added to the Disney plus line up in October 2022 in UK and Ireland.

References

External links

2021 Swedish television series debuts
English-language television shows
Espionage television series
Television shows filmed in the Republic of Ireland
Terrorism in television